Abu Solaiman Chowdhury was a Bangladeshi freedom fighter and civil servant.

Biography
Abu Solaiman Chowdhury joined Bangladesh Administrative Service in 1973. He served as Deputy Commissioner of Dhaka and Pabna .
He also served as Divisional Commissioner of Dhaka Division, Director Prime Minister's Office and Secretary of Ministry of Youth and Sports, Ministry of Cultural Affairs, Ministry of Liberation War Affairs, President's Office and Cabinet Division. When he was the Secretary of Ministry of Liberation War Affairs he played an important role in shifting the grave of Matiur Rahman from Pakistan to Bangladesh. Besides, he also served as Chairman of Bangladesh Privatization Commission and Bangladesh Table Tennis Federation. He also connected with Chattogram Samity in Dhaka. He died on 27 September 2019 in United Hospital, Dhaka.

References 

Bangladeshi civil servants
1950 births
2019 deaths
People from Banshkhali Upazila
People of the Bangladesh Liberation War